Jan Hlaváč (born September 19, 1976) is a Czech professional  ice hockey player who is currently playing for HC Stadion Vrchlabí in CZE.3.

Playing career
Hlaváč has played at the National Hockey League level for the New York Rangers, Philadelphia Flyers, Vancouver Canucks, Carolina Hurricanes, Tampa Bay Lightning and Nashville Predators. His first stint with the Rangers saw him play on the Czech-mate line with countrymen Radek Dvořák and Petr Nedvěd.

He scored 19 goals and 42 points in 1999–2000, his rookie season, and he scored an NHL career high 28 goals and 64 points in 2000–01. He was unable to duplicate his early success in Philadelphia, Vancouver, and Carolina and returned to Europe following a second stint with New York in 2003–04.

After 3 seasons in Europe, Hlaváč returned to the NHL for the 2007–08 NHL season as a member of the Tampa Bay Lightning, scoring 22 points in 62 games before being traded to the Nashville Predators. Hlaváč had decent success with Nashville, scoring 3 goals and 10 assists for 13 points in just 18 games. Hlaváč became an unrestricted free agent after the Predators decided not to retain him on July 1. In August, he signed a one-year contract with Linköpings HC of Swedish Elitserien.

Career statistics

Regular season and playoffs

International

Transactions
 July 14, 1998 - Traded by the New York Islanders to the Calgary Flames in exchange for Jörgen Jönsson.
 June 26, 1999 - Traded by the Calgary Flames along with Calgary's 1999 1st round and 3rd round draft choice, to the New York Rangers in exchange for Marc Savard and New York's 1999 1st round draft choice.
 August 20, 2001 - Traded by the New York Rangers, along with Kim Johnsson, Pavel Brendl and New York's 2003 3rd round draft choice, to the Philadelphia Flyers in exchange for Eric Lindros.
 December 17, 2001 - Traded by the Philadelphia Flyers, along with Tampa Bay's 2002 3rd round draft choice, to the Vancouver Canucks in exchange for Donald Brashear and Vancouver's 2002 6th round draft choice.
 November 1, 2002 - Traded by the Vancouver Canucks, along with Harold Druken, to the Carolina Hurricanes in exchange for Darren Langdon and Marek Malík.
 August 28, 2003 - Signed as a free agent with the New York Rangers.
 June 14, 2007 - Signed as a free agent with the Tampa Bay Lightning.
 February 26, 2008 - Traded by the Tampa Bay Lightning to the Nashville Predators in exchange for a 7th round draft choice.
 August 7, 2008 - Signed as a free agent with Linköpings HC.

References

External links
 

1976 births
Living people
Carolina Hurricanes players
Czech ice hockey left wingers
Genève-Servette HC players
Hartford Wolf Pack players
HC Benátky nad Jizerou players
HC Bílí Tygři Liberec players
HC Karlovy Vary players
Rytíři Kladno players
HC Sparta Praha players
Linköping HC players
Nashville Predators players
New York Islanders draft picks
New York Rangers players
Philadelphia Flyers players
Ice hockey people from Prague
Tampa Bay Lightning players
Vancouver Canucks players
Växjö Lakers players
Czech expatriate ice hockey players in the United States
Czech expatriate ice hockey players in Canada
Czech expatriate ice hockey players in Sweden
Czech expatriate ice hockey players in Switzerland